Canh chua (sour soup) or cá nấu ("cooked fish") is a Vietnamese sour soup indigenous to the Mekong Delta region of Southern Vietnam (Note, Northern and Central Vietnam also have their own canh chua). It is typically made with fish from the Mekong River Delta, pineapple, tomatoes (and sometimes also other vegetables such as đậu bắp or dọc mùng), and bean sprouts, in a tamarind-flavored broth. It is garnished with the lemony-scented herb ngò ôm (Limnophila aromatica), caramelized garlic, and chopped scallions, as well as other herbs, according to the specific variety of canh chua; these other herbs may include rau răm (Vietnamese coriander), ngò gai (long coriander), and rau quế (Thai basil).  It can be served alone, with white rice, or with rice vermicelli.  Variations can include prawns, squid, spare ribs, fish cakes and quail eggs.

The sour taste of the soup comes from tamarind, which is mixed with a small amount of hot water; the mixture is then stirred for a few moments to release all the essence, and the liquid (minus the tamarind seeds and other solids, which are discarded) is then added to the soup.

When made in style of a hot pot, canh chua is called lẩu canh chua.

Varieties
Canh chua me - made with tamarind; includes most varieties of canh chua
Canh chua me đất or canh chua rau nhút - made with water mimosa (Neptunia oleracea)
Canh chua cá - made with fish
Canh chua đầu cá - made with fish heads
Canh chua cá lóc - made with snakehead fish
Canh chua cá bông lau - made with Pangasius krempfi catfish
Canh chua cá lăng - made with Hemibagrus catfish
Canh chua cá ngát - made with Plotosus catfish
Canh chua cá trê - made with airbreathing catfish
Canh chua cá linh bông so đũa - made with mud carp and Sesbania grandiflora flowers
Canh chua lá giang cá kèo - made with Aganonerion polymorphum leaves and mudskipper fish in the genus Apocryptes
Canh chua lươn - made with eel
Canh chua cá hồi - made with salmon
Canh cải chua cá - made with pickled mustard greens and fish
Canh chua tôm - made with shrimp
Canh chua tôm rau muống or canh chua rau muống nấu tôm - made with shrimp and water spinach (Ipomoea aquatica)
Canh chua thơm nấu tép or canh chua thơm nấu với tép - made with pineapple and small shrimp
Canh chua gà - made with chicken
Canh chua lá giang gà or canh chua gà lá giang - made with chicken and Aganonerion polymorphum leaves
Canh chua lá giang cá kèo - made with Aganonerion polymorphum leaves and mudskipper fish in the genus Apocryptes
Canh chua rau muống - made with water spinach (Ipomoea aquatica)
Canh chua tôm rau muống or canh chua rau muống nấu tôm - made with water spinach (Ipomoea aquatica) and shrimp
Canh chua chay - vegetarian
Canh chua đậu hũ - made with tofu
Canh chua măng - made with pickled bamboo shoots
Canh cải chua - made with pickled mustard greens
Canh cải chua thịt bằm - made with pickled mustard greens and ground pork
Canh cải chua sườn non - made with pickled mustard greens and baby back pork ribs
Canh cải chua cá - made with pickled mustard greens and fish
Canh cải chua ruột non or canh cải chua lòng heo - made with pickled mustard greens and pork intestines
Canh cải chua nấu với bắp bò - made with pickled mustard greens and beef shank
Canh chua Thái or canh chua Thái Lan - an adaptation of Thai tom yum

See also

 List of fish dishes

Notes

See also
Samlar machu
Hot and sour soup
Hot pot
Vietnamese cuisine
Penang Asam Laksa

Fish dishes
Vietnamese soups
Vietnamese words and phrases